Tatton is a civil parish in Cheshire East, England. It contains 26 buildings that are recorded in the National Heritage List for England as designated listed buildings.  Of these, one is listed at Grade I, the highest grade, two are listed at Grade II*, the middle grade, and the others are at Grade II.  The major building in the parish is Tatton Hall, and all the listed buildings in the parish are related to it.  These include the hall itself, Tatton Old Hall, the Home Farm, structures in the gardens and park, and lodges at the entrances to Tatton Park.

Key

Buildings

See also

Listed buildings in Rostherne
Listed buildings in Mere
Listed buildings in Knutsford
Listed buildings in Mobberley
Listed buildings in Ashley

References
Citations

Sources

Listed buildings in the Borough of Cheshire East
Lists of listed buildings in Cheshire